Wind River Peak is the highest point in the southern end of the Wind River Range that is located in the U.S. state of Wyoming. The peak straddles the Continental Divide and is surrounded by National Forest lands. The west slopes are in the Bridger Wilderness of Bridger-Teton National Forest, while the east side is in the Popo Agie Wilderness of Shoshone National Forest. In a cirque on the northeast slopes of the peak lies Wind River Glacier.

Hazards

Encountering bears is a concern in the Wind River Range. There are other concerns as well, including bugs, wildfires, adverse snow conditions and nighttime cold temperatures.

Importantly, there have been notable incidents, including accidental deaths, due to falls from steep cliffs (a misstep could be fatal in this class 4/5 terrain) and due to falling rocks, over the years, including 1993, 2007 (involving an experienced NOLS leader), 2015 and 2018. Other incidents include a seriously injured backpacker being airlifted near SquareTop Mountain in 2005, and a fatal hiker incident (from an apparent accidental fall) in 2006 that involved state search and rescue. The U.S. Forest Service does not offer updated aggregated records on the official number of fatalities in the Wind River Range.

See also
 4000 meter peaks of North America
 Central Rocky Mountains

References

External links

Mountains of Fremont County, Wyoming
Mountains of Sublette County, Wyoming
Mountains of Wyoming
Bridger–Teton National Forest
Shoshone National Forest
North American 4000 m summits